Baile Chláir or Baile Chláir na Gaillimhe (anglicized Claregalway) is a Gaeltacht village about 10 km north of Galway city in County Galway, Ireland. Claregalway was founded on the banks of the River Clare, hence the derivation of its name: Baile Chláir na Gaillimhe meaning "town on the Clare, in Galway". Claregalway lies within the Gaeltacht and traditionally most of the locals would have spoken English only as a second language. Until September 2017, the village sat at the junction of the busy N17 and N18 national primary routes with over 27,000 vehicles having formerly passed through the village every day.

Irish language
According to the 2016 Census there were 1,248 people living in Baile Chláir of which less than 2% claimed they spoke Irish every day outside of the education system. This makes Baile Chláir one of the weakest Gaeltacht towns in the country, with the vast majority of the population speaking English.

History

This village has an ancient heritage stretching back over a thousand years. It has many features of historical interest but two of the largest ones on the banks of the river include the Claregalway Friary, founded in mid-13th century, and a Norman watchtower (small castle) completed in the 16th century. During 2001, a restoration of an old bridge over the old course of the River Clare was completed. These nine stone arches are above the level of the current road.

Claregalway Parish is one of the largest in the county and includes a number of townlands (small clusters of houses) some of the bigger being Carnmore, Lydican, Loughgeorge and Cregboy. Lydican is notable as the origin of the Irish ancestors (Patrick Lynch) of Che Guevara. Lydican was actually an O'Heyne Castle and the last of the chieftains, Connor Crone O Heyne, was living there in 1612. The lands of the O'Heyne chieftains was confiscated in the late 17th century and it was then that the Lynches took up residence there. The Lynches principal holdings were in the city of Galway.

Economy
Agriculture would once have been the main industry. In recent years the population has been expanding rapidly since the village is within the commuter belt of Galway City. Some city workers are choosing to live outside the city environs in a more rural setting. However, the larger population has also led to the growth of the service and retail sector and has provided additional local employment.

Culture
Claregalway hosts a drama festival each year in March. Compántas Lir is an amateur drama group which is based in Claregalway and Carnmore. The group tours nationally in the springtime as part of the All-Ireland Drama Circuit.

Education
 Coláiste Bhaile Chláir

Sport
Claregalway CLG is the local Gaelic Athletic Association club.

Claregalway Basketball club participate in local leagues at underage through to senior level.

Claregalway Handball club has members from 7 to 70+ years old. A new-arena style handball alley was opened by the club in 2018.

Annals of Connacht
1469: O Domnaill led a great army into Connacht to meet Macwilliam Burke. They both proceeded to Claregalway and burnt the town in spite of Thomond and Macwilliam, spent a night encamped there and were refused battle then. The next day they burnt the whole of Machaire Clainne Taidc, killing many horses and many men, including Domnall, son of O Conchobair of Corcomroe.

Notable residents
Dana Rosemary Scallon, Irish singer and former MEP.
Hector Ó hEochagáin Irish comedian, TV and radio presenter.

References

External links

 — a community-curated website for Claregalway
Claregalway Castle - Claregalway's landmark castle
Irish language study 2006

Towns and villages in County Galway
Gaeltacht places in County Galway